The Big Ten Conference Men's Basketball Player of the Year is a basketball award given to the Big Ten Conference's most outstanding player. The award was first given following the 1984–85 season. Only three players have won the award multiple times: Jim Jackson of Ohio State (1991, 1992), Mateen Cleaves of Michigan State (1998, 1999) and Luka Garza of Iowa (2020, 2021). Nine players who won the Big Ten Player of the Year award were also named the national player of the year by one or more major voting bodies: Jim Jackson (1992), Calbert Cheaney of Indiana (1993), Glenn Robinson of Purdue (1994), Evan Turner of Ohio State (2010), Draymond Green of Michigan State (2012), Trey Burke of Michigan (2013), Frank Kaminsky of Wisconsin (2015), Denzel Valentine of Michigan State (2016), and Luka Garza of Iowa (2021).

Michigan State has the record for the most winners with nine. Of current Big Ten Conference members, five schools have never had a winner: Maryland, Nebraska, Northwestern, Penn State, and Rutgers. Of these, only Northwestern was in the conference since the inception of this award—Penn State joined the Big Ten in 1991, Nebraska joined in 2011, followed by Maryland and Rutgers in 2014.

Key

Winners

Winners by school

Footnotes
Bobby Jackson's selection was later vacated (along with that season's win total and all other accolades) due to an academic fraud scandal that ruled the entire team ineligible.

References
.

Player of the Year
NCAA Division I men's basketball conference players of the year
Awards established in 1985
1985 establishments in the United States